VA-105 has the following meanings:
Attack Squadron 105 (U.S. Navy)
State Route 105 (Virginia)